This is a List of World Championships medalists in modern pentathlon. The World Modern Pentathlon Championships is the major modern pentathlon competition, along with the Olympic competition.

Men

Individual

Team

Relay

Women

Individual

Team

Relay

Mixed

Relay

See also
Union Internationale de Pentathlon Moderne (UIPM)
Modern pentathlon at the Summer Olympics
List of Olympic medalists in modern pentathlon

References

Edition information
GBR Athletics

External links
Union Internationale de Pentathlon Moderne (UIPM)

medalists
modern pentathlon
World Championships